Samuel Fisk Green (1822–1884) was an American medical missionary. He graduated from the College of Physicians and Surgeons in New York city. He served with the American Ceylon Mission (ACM) in Jaffna, Sri Lanka during the period (1847–1873) when it was the British colony of Ceylon. During his tenure he founded the Sri Lanka's first medical hospital and school in what later became the Green Memorial Hospital in Manipay in the Jaffna peninsula. He translated and published over 4000 pages of medical literature from English to Tamil as part of his efforts to train doctors in their native language. He was personally responsible for training over 60 native doctors of whom majority had their instructions in Tamil.

Early life
Green was born  in Worcester, Massachusetts, to William E. Green and Julia Plimpton as the eighth of 11 children. After his secondary schooling, he was attracted to religion. In 1841 he went to New York City and joined the Protestant Episcopal Board of Missions. During this period he became interested in the medical profession and joined as a medical student and graduating as a doctor in 1845. In 1846, he joined the American Mission and along with a team of missionaries was sent to Ceylon now Sri Lanka. His brother was Andrew Haswell Green, who was instrumental in completing New York City's Central park.

Green retired to Green Hills, Massachusetts in 1873 due to ill health. He died in 1884.

Missionary work
After a four month trip from America, he moved to Ceylon via Madras Presidency in British India in 1847. He initially served at the ACM mission at the Batticotta Seminary.  Although the locals were reluctant use his services, eventually with his capability he became well known for his medical skills. As he attracted a lot of patients and it distracted Batticotta seminaries primary task of education, he was moved to another ACM mission station in Manipay in 1848.
At Manipay, in addition to providing medical services to patients who came in search of him, he established the first medical school to teach western medicine to the Tamil people of Jaffna, thus opening, Sri Lanka's first medical hospital and teaching facility that became known as Green memorial hospital. Green Memorial Hospital was managed by the  Jaffna Diocese of the Church of South India (JDCSI) the successor organization of ACM. It celebrated the 150th anniversary of the Green Memorial Hospital, and the ACM medical mission, in October 1998.

Translating from English to Tamil
Initially when Dr. Green appealed for assistance for the publication of some medical books in Tamil, the colonial government refused aid.  But after a decade, the same government doubled its aid and also requested Dr. Green to superintend the preparation and printing of Sanitary and Medical action related literature in Cholera times.  Dr. Green wanted to prepare the trained physicians to stay in their native villages to help the locals instead migrating to find work within the colonial administration. 
To teach western medicine in Tamil, he had to coin technical terms in Tamil, translate western medical books into Tamil and write medical books in Tamil. This meant the development of medical and scientific Tamil as different from the established literary Tamil. There was also a need to write medical treatises in simple Tamil for the benefit of the common people – the layman.

Bibliography 
Following is a list of his Translations from English into Tamil and the year of publication.
Non-Fiction
 Cutter’s Anatomy, Physiology and Hygiene. 204 pages 1857
 Maunsell’s Obstetrics 258 pages 1857
 Druitt’s Surgery 504 pages 1867
 Gray’s Anatomy 838 pages 1872
 Hooper's Physician’s Vade Mecum 917 pages 1875
 Dalton’s Physiology 590 pages 1883
 Waring’s Pharmacopoeia of India 574 pages 1884
 Well’s Chemistry 516 pages 1875

References

External links
 Medical Missionaries in Jaffna
Pioneer of scientific Tamil
John Plimpton Green Letters Jefferson Digital Commons, Thomas Jefferson University

1822 births
1884 deaths
People from Worcester, Massachusetts
American Anglican missionaries
American Ceylon Mission
American expatriates in Sri Lanka
Missionary educators
Tamil scholars of non-Tamil background
Christian medical missionaries
Anglican missionaries in Sri Lanka
Missionary linguists